Night Shift is a 2018 Russian comedy film directed by Maryus Vaysberg. It stars Vladimir Yaglych and Pavel Derevyanko.

Plot
Max works at a local factory as a welder. The salary is low, but it is enough to support him and his wife Anya. One day he learns bad news - the factory has gone bankrupt and all employees are laid off. He desperately tries to find a new place to work but this proves to be quite difficult due to the economic crisis. Fortunately, Max meets his old friend from school, Lena. After telling her about his problems, he receives an unusual offer - to do striptease.

There is a strip club in the city where new men are wanted. Max agrees to come for an interview. His fitness and physique is satisfactory and the only thing that remains is to learn a few dance moves and he is hired. While hiding his new occupation from Anya, he finds himself in all sorts of ridiculous situations. Her husband's new profession is supposed to stay a secret, but all the lies only end up complicating things.

Cast
 Vladimir Yaglych as Maxim "Max" Samsonov
Pavel Derevyanko as Sergei "Seryoga" Balashov
 Ksenia Teplova as Anna "Anya" Samsonova, Max's wife
 Vitaliya Korniyenko as Vera Samsonova, the Samsonovs' daughter
 Natalia Bardo as Kristina, striptease dancer
 Anna Mikhailovskaya as Lyudmila
 Emin Agalarov as Igor Chernyavsky, businessman
 Valentina Mazunina as Lena, Max's classmate, strip club manager
 Yelena Valyushkina as Elena Balashova, Sergei's mother
 Sergei Glushko as Zhenya "King Kong"
 Svetlana Listova as Anfisa, an accountant
 Galina Petrova as Betty Slobodkina, a teacher
 Igor Jijikine as Korneev, director of the strip club
Natalya Bochkareva as Korneev's wife

References

External links 
 
2018 films
2010s Russian-language films
2018 comedy films
Russian comedy films
Films about striptease
Films directed by Maryus Vaysberg